Matthew Peter Mott (born 3 October 1973) is an Australian cricket coach and a former first-class cricketer. He is the former coach of the Australian Women's Cricket Team. He currently coaches the England men's white-ball cricket team.

Playing career
Mott played for the Victorian Bushrangers and Queensland Bulls. He was part of the Australian Cricket Academy in Adelaide in 1995. A left-handed batsman, he made his first-class debut in 1994–95, playing for Queensland. He was in and out of the side but made a crucial 86 in Queensland's 1996–97 Sheffield Shield Final. He relocated to Victoria for the 1998–99 season and performed well, cementing his spot in the upper order. His first season included centuries against New South Wales and Western Australia. He made 841 first-class runs the following summer to help Victoria reach the final for the first time in nine years. A highlight of his career with Victoria was a 223 run opening partnership with Jason Arnberger. He finished his 66-game career in 2004 with 3723 runs at 33.84 with seven hundreds.

Coaching career
Mott was appointed coach of the New South Wales Blues for the 2007–08 after two years as assistant coach. In his first season as coach, New South Wales won the Pura Cup.

He signed a three-year contract as the 1st XI coach of Glamorgan County Cricket Club on 14 January 2011. On 20 August 2013, it was announced that Mott would be leaving his role with Glamorgan after the end of the season. He then led Glamorgan to the final of the 2013 Yorkshire Bank 40, where they lost to Nottinghamshire.

Mott was appointed coach of the Australia women's national cricket team in March 2015, replacing Cathryn Fitzpatrick. In April 2017, he was re-signed to coach the Australian women's team until 2020. In 2020, he coached the winning women's team at the T20 World Cup.

In May 2022, Mott was announced as the white-ball coach of the England cricket team.

In November 2022, Mott coached the England cricket team men's T20 side to victory over Pakistan in the ICC World Cup in Australia.

Honours

Head coach
Australia women
ODI World Cup: 2022
T20 World Cup: 2018, 2020

England men
T20 World Cup: 2022

References

1973 births
Living people
Queensland cricketers
Victoria cricketers
Netherlands cricketers
Australian people of Dutch descent
Australian cricketers
Australian cricket coaches
Cricketers from Queensland